This is a list of islands of Chile, as listed by the National Geospatial-Intelligence Agency, Country Files (GNS). The country has 43,471 islands, according to the Chilean Ministry of National Assets and the Chilean Military Geographical Institute, in the last update at 2019.

This list includes full names, generic inverted. The complete term used to identify a named feature is known as the full name. As stored in the database, the entire name is output as "Desertores, Islas" rather than reading "Islas Desertores."

The feature is latitude expressed in decimal degrees. Decimal degrees of the feature's longitude

A geographically named feature is uniquely identified by a Unique Feature Identifier (UFI), which is a number. A similar UFI denotes a similar feature.

Chilean claims in the Antarctic are not included on this list. see also the list of islands in the Antarctic and subantarctic.

The general terms "isla", "isla de/los/las", "islote", "islita", "isleta", "island," "islet," "islets," "rocks," "islas," "islotes," "islas de," "Archipiélago," and "Grupo" are used to name the items in NGA. Listed here

More information
For more information about the island search in GeoNames Search, using the Unique Feature Id (UFI) in the "Advanced Search" Form.

Inconsistencies and phantom islands
The following Chilean islands are not listed by the National Geospatial-Intelligence Agency:

 Águila Islet (the really southernmost tip of American Chile) 
 Calbuco Archipelago (but includes Calbuco Island)
 Desventuradas Islands (They are under the names "San Ambrosio" UFI -900077, "González" UFI -883263 and "San Félix" UFI -900282)

Elizabeth Island (Cape Horn), Podesta (island), Pactolus Bank or other phantom islands are not listed. Gable Island is listed by NGA as a Chilean Island, but it is in Argentine.

The list contains 2,873 names for 2,324 "features".The features with the most names are UFI -874308 (eight different names) and UFI -884934 (six different names).

List of islands

See also

 Islands of Chile
 Archipelagoes of Patagonia
 Fjords and channels of Chile
 List of fjords, channels, sounds and straits of Chile
 List of Antarctic and subantarctic islands
 List of lighthouses in Chile

References

External links

 Islands of Chile @ United Nations Environment Programme
 World island information @ WorldIslandInfo.com
 South America Island High Points above 1000 meters
 
 
 
 

Islands
Chile
Islands